Claude Alfred "Lefty" Thomas (May 15, 1890 – March 6, 1946) was a Major League Baseball pitcher who played for the Washington Senators in .

External links

1890 births
1946 deaths
Major League Baseball pitchers
Baseball players from Missouri
Washington Senators (1901–1960) players
People from Gentry County, Missouri
Bartlesville Boosters players
Kewanee Boilermakers players
Steubenville Stubs players
Wichita Witches players
Providence Grays (minor league) players
Rochester Hustlers players
Clarksdale Swamp Angels players
Grand Rapids Champs players
Des Moines Boosters players
Minneapolis Millers (baseball) players
Wichita Jobbers players
Seattle Rainiers players
Los Angeles Angels (minor league) players
Vernon Tigers players
Des Moines Demons players